The 2016 FIA European Touring Car Cup was the twelfth running of the FIA European Touring Car Cup. It consisted of six events in France (twice), Slovakia, Germany, Portugal and Italy. 

The championship was split into two categories: Super 2000 (including TC2 Turbo, TC2 and TCN-2 machinery) and Super 1600.

Teams and drivers

The races at the Nürburgring had both WTCC and ETCC competitors. ETCC competitors entered with their usual car numbers, but with 100 added up to it.

Race calendar and results
The first four rounds were supporting the World Touring Car Championship, whereas the final two rounds were jointly with the FFSA GT Tour.

Championship standings
Points were awarded to the top eight classified finishers using the following structure:

Qualifying points: 1 2 3 refers to the classification of the drivers after the qualifying for first race, where bonus points are awarded 3–2–1.

† — Drivers did not finish the race, but were classified as they completed over 75% of the race distance.
‡ — Double points were awarded.

References

External links

European Touring Car Cup
European Touring Car Cup
Touring Car Cup